Marilyn A. Brown is the Regents' and Brook Byers Professor of Sustainable Systems in the School of Public Policy at the Georgia Institute of Technology. She joined Georgia Tech in 2006 after 22 years at Oak Ridge National Laboratory, where she held various leadership positions managing programs focused on the efficient use of energy, renewable energy, and the electric grid. With Eric Hirst, she coined the term "energy efficiency gap" and pioneered research to highlight and quantify the unexploited economic potential to use energy more productively.

Brown was elected a member of the National Academy of Engineering in 2020 for bridging engineering, social and behavioral sciences, and policy studies to achieve cleaner electric energy.

Career
At Georgia Tech, Brown leads the Climate and Energy Policy Laboratory and co-directs the Master of Sustainable Energy and Environmental Management in the School of Public Policy. These initiatives focus on clean energy policies, trends in the U.S. South, and the smart grid, and they span the triad of climate mitigation, climate adaptation, and geo-engineering. CEPL is distinct in its analysis of climate change and energy policies using the National Energy Modeling System (NEMS) and other modeling platforms.

Among her honors and awards, she is an elected member of the National Academy of Sciences and the National Academy of Engineering. From 2010 to 2018 she was appointed by President Barack Obama to two terms on the Board of Directors of the Tennessee Valley Authority. During her 8 years as a regulator, TVA reduced its  emissions by 50%, brought a new nuclear reactor on line, and modeled energy efficiency as a virtual power plant in its integrated resource planning. In 2019, she was a recipient of the 2019 Charles H. Percy Award for Public Service, given by the Alliance to Save Energy. In 2022, Brown received the Class of 1934 Distinguished Professor Award, the highest honor that can be given to a Georgia Tech Professor. 
 She received the World Citizen Prizes in Environmental Performance Award by the Association for Public Policy Analysis and Management (APPAM) in 2021.

Brown co-founded the Southeast Energy Efficiency Alliance and chaired its first board of directors. She has served on the boards of the American Council for an Energy-Efficient Economy, the Alliance to Save Energy, and the Bipartisan Policy Center. She co-chaired the National Academies of Sciences, Engineering and Medicine Committee on America's Climate Futures and has served on seven other NASEM committees, is an Editor of Energy Policy, and serves on the Editorial Boards of Energy Efficiency and Energy Research & Social Science. She served on the Electricity Advisory Committee of the United States Department of Energy from 2015 to 2018) and chaired its Smart Grid Subcommittee.

Education
Brown received her Bachelor of Arts from Rutgers University in political science and a minor in mathematics in 1971. In 1973, she earned her master's degree from the University of Massachusetts Amherst in resource planning. In 1977, she obtained her Ph.D. from Ohio State University in geography with a minor in quantitative methods. She is a certified energy manager with the Association of Energy Engineers.

Publications
Brown's books on clean energy policy, technology, behavior, and economics include:

Empowering the Great Energy Transition, Columbia University Press, 2019.  
Fact and Fiction in Global Energy Policy: Fifteen Contentious Questions, Johns Hopkins University Press. 2016. 
Green Savings: How Policy and Markets Drive Energy Efficiency, Praeger. 2015. 
Climate Change and Global Energy Security, MIT Press, 2011. 
Shrinking the carbon footprint of metropolitan America, Washington, DC: Brookings Institution, 2008.
Energy and American Society: Thirteen Myths, Springer Press, 2007. 

Brown's work has also been published in top policy and sustainability related journals, such as Proceedings of the National Academy of Sciences (PNAS), Science, Nature Energy, Energy Policy, Applied Energy, Environmental Science & Technology, Journal of Cleaner Production, Policy and Society, Renewable Energy, Ecological Economics, Research Policy, Global Environmental Change, Energy Efficiency, Climatic Change, Energy Research & Social Science, Resourcs, Conservation and Recycling, The Electricity Journal, and Environmental Research Letters. Some examples include:
 Brown, Marilyn A., et al. (2021). “A Framework for Localizing Global Climate Solutions and their Carbon Reduction Potential,” Proceedings of the National Academy of Sciences, 118 (31);  https://doi.org/10.1073/pnas.2100008118
 Brown, M. A., Soni, A., Doshi, A. D., & King, C. (2020). "The persistence of high energy burdens: A bibliometric analysis of vulnerability, poverty, and exclusion in the United States". Energy research & social science, 70, 101756; https://doi.org/10.1016/j.erss.2020.101756
Brown, M. A., Zhou, S., & Ahmadi, M. (2018). "Smart grid governance: An international review of evolving policy issues and innovations". Wiley Interdisciplinary Reviews: Energy and Environment, 7(5), e290; https://doi.org/10.1002/wene.290
Brown, M. A., Wang, Y., Sovacool, B. K., & D’Agostino, A. L. (2014). "Forty years of energy security trends: A comparative assessment of 22 industrialized countries". Energy Research & Social Science, 4, 64-77; https://doi.org/10.1016/j.erss.2014.08.008
Brown, M. A., Southworth, F., & Sarzynski, A. (2009). "The geography of metropolitan carbon footprints". Policy and Society, 27(4), 285-304; https://doi.org/10.1016/j.polsoc.2009.01.001
Brown, M. A. (2001). "Market failures and barriers as a basis for clean energy policies." Energy policy, 29(14), 1197-1207; https://doi.org/10.1016/S0301-4215(01)00067-2

See also 
 Amory Lovins
 Benjamin K. Sovacool
 Efficient energy use
 Martin J. Pasqualetti
 Renewable energy policy

References 

Year of birth missing (living people)
Living people
Georgia Tech faculty
American non-fiction environmental writers
Oak Ridge National Laboratory people
Ohio State University College of Arts and Sciences alumni
Energy engineers
Rutgers University alumni
American environmentalists
University of Massachusetts Amherst alumni
Members of the United States National Academy of Sciences
American women writers
American women academics
21st-century American women